African Party for Independence of the Masses (in French: Parti Africain pour l'Indépendance des Masses) is a black nationalist political party in Senegal. It was legally registered in July 1982. PAIM publishes Nation Africaine.

PAIM favours a form of direct participative democracy.

In spite of its name, PAIM shares no organic link with PAI. Unlike PAI,  PAIM is a non-Marxist party.

Sources
Zuccarelli, François. La vie politique sénégalaise (1940-1988). Paris: CHEAM, 1988.

1982 establishments in Senegal
African and Black nationalist parties in Africa
Political parties established in 1982
Political parties in Senegal